Joan Josep Laguarda i Fenollera was Bishop of Urgel and ex officio Co-Prince of Andorra from 1902 to 1906. He was also Bishop of Barcelona from 29 April 1909 – 4 December 1913.

References 

''

20th-century Princes of Andorra
Bishops of Urgell
20th-century Roman Catholic bishops in Spain